San Giorgio Monferrato  (in Piedmontese San Giòrs Monfrà) is a comune of the Province of Alessandria in the Italian region Piedmont.

Its population of 1,293 is concentrated in the village of San Giorgio (Saint George). The communal coat of arms pictures the saint killing the dragon. San Giorgio clusters around a medieval castle on a low hill southwest of Casale Monferrato, which dominates the road from Casale to Asti.

San Giorgio Monferrato borders the following municipalities: Casale Monferrato, Ozzano Monferrato, and Rosignano Monferrato.

Demographic evolution

Twin towns — sister cities
San Giorgio Monferrato is twinned with:

  Saint-Julien, France

References

Cities and towns in Piedmont